Ellisiophyllum is a monotypic genus of flowering plants belonging to the family Plantaginaceae. It contains just 1 species, Ellisiophyllum pinnatum (Wall. ex Benth.) Makino 

Its native range is Central Himalaya to New Guinea. It is found in the countries of China, East Himalaya, Japan, Nepal, New Guinea, Philippines and Taiwan.

Its genus name of Ellisiophyllum is in honour of John Ellis (1710–1776), a British linen merchant and naturalist, and phyllum meaning leaf. The specific epithet  is from the Latin meaning "feather-like", referring to the leaves.

It was first published and described in Bot. Mag. (Tokyo) Vol.20 on page 91 in 1906.

It has 1 known subspecies Ellisiophyllum pinnatum subsp. bhutanense  ,from Bhutan.

References

Plantaginaceae
Plantaginaceae genera
Plants described in 1877
Flora of the Indian subcontinent
Flora of Asia